Macrocarpamine is an Alstonia alkaloid with antiplasmodial activity.

References

Indole alkaloids